"Angela" is a song performed by the Bee Gees from the album E.S.P., released as a single in 1987. It was written by Barry, Robin and Maurice Gibb. The demo version appears on The E.S.P. Demos, and there is a promo video for this song. In West Germany, the song reached a chart position of No. 52.

Recording
The song, a midtempo ballad, is performed by Barry Gibb, with a brief chorus and a long winding melody much in Barry's style. In its demo, it features Barry's vocals with Robin also singing a few lines. Its emotional peaks were matched by Barry's own guitar playing, supported by instrumental and vocal work by Maurice and Robin. In the finished version, Barry re-recorded another vocal. Musicians who played on the song consist of Robbie Kondor and Rhett Lawrence on keyboards, Greg Phillinganes on piano, Brian Tench on programming, Nick Moroch on guitar and Will Lee on bass (who also worked with Mariah Carey, Cher and others).

Charts

Personnel
 Barry Gibb – vocals, guitar, drum programming
 Robin Gibb – backing vocals
 Maurice Gibb – guitar, backing vocals
 Robbie Kondor – keyboards
 Rhett Lawrence – keyboards
 Greg Phillinganes – piano
 Brian Tench – programming
 Nick Moroch – guitar
 Will Lee – bass

References

1987 singles
1988 singles
1987 songs
Bee Gees songs
Demis Roussos songs
Songs written by Barry Gibb
Songs written by Robin Gibb
Songs written by Maurice Gibb
Song recordings produced by Barry Gibb
Song recordings produced by Robin Gibb
Song recordings produced by Maurice Gibb
Song recordings produced by Arif Mardin
Pop ballads